Countess Emilia Broel-Plater (13 November 1806 – 23 December 1831) was a Polish–Lithuanian noblewoman and revolutionary from the lands of the partitioned Polish–Lithuanian Commonwealth. Raised in a patriotic tradition in Līksna near Daugavpils, she fought in the November Uprising of 1830–1831 against the Russian Empire. She raised a small unit, participated in several engagements in present-day Lithuania, and received the rank of captain in the Polish insurgent forces. When the main forces under the General Dezydery Chłapowski decided to cease fighting and cross into Prussia, Plater vowed to continue the fight and wanted to cross into Poland where the uprising was still ongoing. However, she fell ill and died.

She was a leader in an uprising and her story became widely publicized and inspired a number of works of art and literature. A maiden warrior, she is a national heroine in Poland, Lithuania and Belarus. She has been venerated by Polish artists and by the nation at large as a symbol of women fighting for the national cause. She has been referred to as the Lithuanian or Polish Joan of Arc.

Biography

Early life

Plater was born in Vilnius into a noble Polish–Lithuanian Plater family. Her family, of the Plater coat of arms, traced its roots to Westphalia, but was thoroughly Polonized. Much of the family relocated to Livonia during the 15th century and later to the Grand Duchy of Lithuania, of which Vilnius is the capital. She is described as either Polish, Polish-Lithuanian or Lithuanian.

Her parents, Franciszek Ksawery Plater and Anna von der Mohl (Anna z Mohlów), divorced in 1815 when she was nine years old. A single child, she was brought up by distant relatives, Michał Plater-Zyberk and Izabela Helena Syberg zu Wischling, in their family's manor Līksna near Daugavpils (Dźwina), then Inflanty (now Latvia). It was an aristocratic family that owned several manors along the Daugava River with about 15,000 serfs. Plater-Zyberk served as vice-governor of the Vilna Governorate under governor Franciszek Ksawery Drucki-Lubecki. Plater's tutors included Wilhelm von Dalwig, captain and military engineer working on the Daugavpils Fortress. Well-educated, Plater was brought up to appreciate the efforts of Tadeusz Kościuszko and the Prince Józef Poniatowski. She was fascinated by Johann Wolfgang von Goethe and Friedrich Schiller, who she could read in the original German language. She was raised in an environment that valued the history of Poland, and her literary heroes included Princess Wanda and Adam Mickiewicz's Grażyna. She also admired Bouboulina, a woman who became one of the icons of the Greek uprising against the Ottomans, a Polish fighter Anna Dorota Chrzanowska, as well as Joan of Arc. These pursuits were accompanied by an early interest in equestrianism and marksmanship, quite uncommon for early 19th-century girls from aristocratic families. She was also deeply interested in Ruthenian and Belarusian folk culture and had contacts and friends in the Filaret Association.

In 1823, one of her cousins was forcibly conscripted into the Imperial Russian Army as a punishment for celebrating the Constitution of 3 May; this incident is said to be one of the key events in her life and one that galvanized her pro-Polish and anti-Russian attitude. In 1829, Plater began a grand tour throughout the historical Polish–Lithuanian Commonwealth, visiting Warsaw and Kraków, and the battlefield of Raszyn. Her mother died a year later; her father remarried and refused to even meet his daughter. After the outbreak of the November Uprising against Imperial Russia, she became a vocal supporter of the anti-Tsarist sentiments in the lands of the former Grand Duchy of Lithuania. A dozen or so females joined the uprising, including Antonina Tomaszewska, but Plater became the most famous of them all.

Uprising

In her note from 25 March written at the Antazavė Manor, Plater claims that joining the uprising was her sole idea and that she had hoped to go to war her entire life. She cut her hair, prepared a uniform for herself and organized and equipped a group of volunteers. She went to her cousin  in Dusetos and delivered a passionate speech after a mass on 29 March. The following day, her group attacked a post station in Daugailiai and captured horses for her unit. On 4 April, she signed a declaratory document marking her access to the local uprising forces. The same day, her unit is rumored to have seized the town of Zarasai, although the historians are not sure this event really occurred. 

She planned to take Daugavpils where two of her cousins, Lucjan and Ferdynand Plater, attended a military school and hoped to start an uprising from within, but after a reconnaissance mission discovered that the city was defended by a strong garrison and was impregnable to attack by such a small force as her own unit, that plan was abandoned. Her unit was composed of roughly 280 infantry, 60 cavalry and several hundred peasants armed with war scythes. On 5 May, she witnessed General Dezydery Chłapowski entering the area with a large force and taking command over all units fighting in the former Grand Duchy.

Chłapowski advised Plater to stand down and return home. She allegedly replied that she had no intention of taking off her uniform until her fatherland was fully liberated. Her decision was accepted and she was made a commanding officer of the 1st Company of the Lithuanian 25th Infantry Regiment. She was promoted to the rank of captain, the highest rank awarded to a woman at that time. Her companion Maria Raszanowicz was promoted to the rank of poruchik (lieutenant). She spent some time in Kaunas, before the insurgents were forced to retreat in late June. On 8 July, the insurgents tried to capture Šiauliai but were defeated by the Russians. Plater's unit was in charge of protecting the baggage train with supplies. When the train was attacked, about 300 insurgents were killed and the supplies were captured by the Russians.

The following day, General Chłapowski decided to cross the border into Prussia and become interned there. Plater vocally criticized that decision, refused to follow orders and instead decided to try to break through to Warsaw and continue the fight. However, after separating from the main force, accompanied by Maria Raszanowicz and her cousin Cezary Plater, she became seriously ill. The uprising ended in October and many of her biographies claim that the heartbreak exacerbated her illness leading to her death. She died in the Justinavas Manor of the Abłamowicz family (now ) on 23 December 1831. She was buried in the small town of Kapčiamiestis near Lazdijai. After the defeat of the uprising, her estate was confiscated by the Russian authorities.

Stefan Kieniewicz, in a more critical treatment in the Polish Biographical Dictionary, notes that a lot of her exploits are poorly documented, and it is not always possible to separate legend from facts. He notes it is not certain she ever commanded any unit, and that her role as the company commander of the 25th Regiment was more honorary than real. At Prastavoniai, she fainted from fatigue and fell off her horse. She had to be rescued at Kaunas, though accounts vary. According to one version, her clothes got caught when riding through a gate and she fell off her horse but was rescued by S. Maciewicz. Another version claims that she fought valiantly and refused to retreat, but was rescued by colonel Kiekiernicki. At Šiauliai, she was purposefully held behind front lines, as her comrades tried to ensure she would not endanger herself.

Legacy

Her life and death were widely publicised shortly afterwards by the Polish press, which contributed to her growing fame. The image of the maiden warrior became popular and became a symbol of the uprising. Adam Mickiewicz immortalized her in his 1832 poem, Śmierć pułkownika (Death of a Colonel) where he called her up as a leader, although the description of her death is a pure poetical fiction and was only loosely based on her real life. The poem promotes Plater from captain to colonel and refers to her as the leader of the uprising. Mickiewicz has also idealized her personality and skills, portraying her as the ideal commander, worshiped by her soldiers. That poem has entered the elementary curriculum in communist and independent Poland.

Other literary works based on her life were published, mostly abroad, both by Polish émigrés and by foreigners. A four-act play Les Polonais: événements historique by Charles Prosper was performed at the Cirque Olympique in Paris in 1831. Other plays were written by Janina Sedlaczek (1895), Władysław Winiarski (1912), Adam Znamirowski (1915), Eustachy Czekalski (1917), Wanda Brzeska (1927), Tadeusz Korczyński (1933), Tadeusz Orsza Korpal (1937). A Lithuanian play by Antanas Vienuolis was staged by the Kaunas State Theatre in 1939. A poetic drama by Judita Vaičiūnaitė was broadcast by the LRT Radijas.

 published three successive versions of her biography in French. An English translation, supported by among others President John Tyler, was published in New York in 1843. Most of the later biographers and writers largely follow the idealized version of her life presented by Straszewicz. Plater was also featured as a role model in the Woman in the Nineteenth Century (1845) by the women's rights advocate Margaret Fuller. In 1996, Halina Filipowicz published a study from a feminist perspective on Plater's legacy on gender roles and stereotypes in Poland.

She also became the theme of paintings by several artists of the epoch, among them Hippolyte Bellangé, Achille Deveria, Philipp Veit, and Wojciech Kossak. A lithograph by François Le Villain based on Deveria's work became one of the most recognizable portraits of her, popularizing her image as a delicate and noble female warrior. 

Emilia Plater has been depicted on the 50 zloty in 1940. She was depicted on the Second Polish Republic's 20 zloty note. During World War II, a Polish female support unit, Emilia Plater 1st Independent Women's Battalion, a part of the Soviet Polish 1st Tadeusz Kościuszko Infantry Division was named in her honor; its former members founded a village of Platerówka in Lower Silesia. Several streets, including  In Kapčiamiestis, a small memorial museum in her honor was opened in 1984 and a monument to Plater by sculptor  was erected in 1999.

Emilia Plater is a patron of 14 schools in Poland and several in Lithuania. 

Artistic and historical exhibitions commemorating Emilia Plater have been taking place in Belarus, although her figure remains largely ignored by the official state ideology of the Lukashenka regime.

See also 
 Maria Piotrowiczowa, female insurgent of the 1863 Polish uprising

References

External links 

 Original letter by Emilia Plater, in which she confirms the fact that she joined the ranks of the army of her own will
 Westphalian Plater family

1806 births
1831 deaths
Military personnel from Vilnius
People from Vilensky Uyezd
Emilia
Polish countesses
Lithuanian people of German descent
Polish Army officers
19th-century Lithuanian women
19th-century Polish military personnel
Polish female soldiers
Women in 19th-century warfare
November Uprising participants